"Don't Cry for Me" is a song by Brazilian DJ and record producer Alok, Danish DJ and record producer Martin Jensen, with vocals from American singer Jason Derulo. It was released as a single on July 10, 2020, by Virgin Records. The song was written by Derulo, Richard Boardman, Pablo Bowman, Alok, David Strääf, Ohyes and James Blount.

Personnel
Credits adapted from Tidal.

 Alok – producer, composer, lyricist, associated performer, guitar, music production
 Martin Jensen – producer, associated performer, music production, synthesizer
 Ohyes – producer, composer, lyricist, associated performer, bass programming, drum programming, mixer, music production, piano, programming, recording arranger, sound effects, studio personnel, synthesizer
 The Six – producer, associated performer
 David Strääf – composer, lyricist, associated performer, bass programming, drum programming, guitar, piano, programming, recording arranger, sound effects, synthesizer
 James Blount – composer, lyricist
 Jason Derulo – composer, lyricist, associated performer, vocals
 Pablo Bowman – composer, lyricist, associated performer, whistle
 Richard Boardman – composer, lyricist, associated performer, music production, piano, programming, recording arranger, synthesizer
 Ben Hogarth – associated performer, studio personnel, vocal engineer, vocal producer
 Robbie Soukiasyan – associated performer, studio personnel, vocal engineer, vocal producer
 One Mix Mastering – mastering engineer, studio personnel
 Tom Hall – mastering engineer, studio personnel

Charts

Release history

References

2020 singles
2020 songs
Alok (DJ) songs
Jason Derulo songs
Martin Jensen songs
Songs written by James Blunt
Songs written by Jason Derulo
Songs written by Richard Boardman
Songs written by Pablo Bowman